Wakaba is a Japanese word and name meaning "young leaf". It may refer to:

Shoshinsha mark or wakaba mark, a sign displayed in new drivers' cars in Japan

Characters
Wakaba Shinohara, a character in the anime Revolutionary Girl Utena
Wakaba (Suikoden), a character in the video game Suikoden II
Hinata Wakaba, a character in the video game Rival Schools
Tsukishima Wakaba, one of the four sisters in Cross Game
Nogi Wakaba, a main character of her story in the Yuki Yuna is a Hero universe
Wakaba, a girl character from Pro Golfer Saru

People
Ryuya Wakaba, Japanese actor
Wakaba Hara, Japanese rugby sevens player
Wakaba Higuchi, Olympic medal-winning Japanese figure skater
Wakaba Shimoguchi, Japanese football player
Wakaba Suzuki, retired Japanese judoka
Wakaba Tomita, Japanese judoka

Ships
, a Japanese  sunk at the Battle of Leyte Gulf in 1944
, the former destroyer Nashi, a Japanese destroyer that was salvaged after being sunk in 1945

Other uses
Wakaba-ku, one of the six wards of the city of Chiba in Japan
Wakaba Girl, a manga and anime by Yui Hara

Japanese feminine given names
Japanese-language surnames